The Swan 48 Frers is the second version Swan 48 model and the first designed by German Frers and built by Nautor's Swan and first launched in 1995. It came in two version originally launched with the "cruising" rig is the most popular and used cruiser/racer. The design was optimised for regatta racing with reduced displacement and larger fractional rig.

External links
 Nautor Swan
 German Frers Official Website

References

Sailing yachts
Keelboats
1990s sailboat type designs
Sailboat types built by Nautor Swan
Sailboat type designs by Germán Frers